Tanjungpura is a name of a small town in Ketapang Regency of West Kalimantan, Indonesia.
It was formerly the capital of the Tanjungpura Kingdom.

External links
  http://ketapangcityku.blogspot.com/2012/07/makam-raja-tanjungpura-ketapang.html
  http://visit-ketapang.weebly.com/tanjungpura-kingdom.html

Ketapang